The Carnegie Hall Concerts is the name of a series of live albums from Duke Ellington:

The Carnegie Hall Concerts: January 1943
The Carnegie Hall Concerts: December 1944
The Carnegie Hall Concerts: January 1946
The Carnegie Hall Concerts: December 1947

Duke Ellington live albums
Albums recorded at Carnegie Hall
Live album series